The Curtiss D-12, sometimes identified with the military designation Curtiss V-1150, was an aircraft engine of 18.8 liter displacement. It was a water-cooled V12, producing 443 hp (330 kW) and weighing 693 lb (314 kg). It was designed by Arthur Nutt in 1921 and used in the Curtiss CR-3 for the 1923 Schneider Trophy race. Fairey Aviation of England imported 50 Curtiss-built examples in 1926, renaming them the Fairey Felix.

The D-12 was one of the first truly successful aluminum cast-block engines and was extremely influential in the interwar period. Numerous engines trace their design to the D-12, among them the Packard 1A-1500, Rolls-Royce Kestrel and Junkers Jumo 210.

Applications

D-12
 Boeing Model 15
 Curtiss CR
 Curtiss Falcon
 Curtiss P-5
 Curtiss PW-8
 Curtiss R2C
 Fokker D.XII
 Macchi M.33
 Wittman D-12 Bonzo

Felix
 Fairey Firefly I
 Fairey Fox

Specifications (Curtiss D-12/Felix)

See also

References

Notes

Bibliography

 Lumsden, Alec. British Piston Engines and their Aircraft. Marlborough, Wiltshire: Airlife Publishing, 2003. .

External links

 Great Aircraft Engines - Curtiss D-12
 "The Curtiss Model CD-12 400 H.P. Aero Engine" a 1922 Flight article on the CD-12

D-12
1920s aircraft piston engines